Andrew Holbrook (born February 6, 1986) is an American mixed martial artist and the former Colosseum Combat lightweight champion. He competed in the Lightweight division of the Ultimate Fighting Championship.

Background

Holbrook started wrestling and running track when he was in middle school in Adrian, Michigan. He believes that the mental toughness served an important factor in fighting which he was well-trained in this department by his middle school wrestling coach Jim Waters. He started training MMA after he had his hands in a few fights. Besides training at IBG in Indiana, he also has trained at Tiger Muay Thai in Phuket Island, Thailand.

Mixed martial arts career

Early career
Holbrook fought in various regional MMA promotions, primarily in Indiana such as Absolute Cage Fighting, Midwest Fight Series, Colosseum Combat and Michiana Fight League prior to joining the UFC.  He stepped in to replace an injured Joe Lile Jr. against Tyler Combs at the Colosseum Combat 32 lightweight title bout and won the fight via TKO and became Colosseum Combat lightweight champion.

Ultimate Fighting Championship
Holbrook amassed an undefeated record of 11 wins, 10 stoppages with nine of them by submission, prior to signing with the Ultimate Fighting Championship.

Holbrook made his promotional debut on short notice, as he was tabbed as an injury replacement for Erik Koch against Ramsey Nijem on July 25, 2015 at UFC on Fox: Dillashaw vs. Barão 2. Holbrook won the fight via split decision.

Holbrook was scheduled to face Sage Northcutt on January 30, 2016 at UFC on Fox 18. However, he was forced to pull out of the fight due to a foot injury and was replaced by Bryan Barberena.

Holbrook faced Joaquim Silva on July 8, 2016 at The Ultimate Fighter 23 Finale. He lost the fight via knockout in round one.

Holbrook next faced Jake Matthews on November 27, 2016 at UFC Fight Night: Whittaker vs. Brunson. He won the fight via split decision. He said in his post fight interview “[Beating Matthews] felt good. I was expecting to be an underdog, going into somebody’s home town. It was kind of nice, and everybody enjoyed the fight I think."

At UFC 210, Holbrook faced Gregor Gillespie on April 8, 2017. He lost the fight via knockout 21 seconds into the first round.

Holbrook faced Thibault Gouti on September 2, 2017 at UFC Fight Night 115. He lost the fight via TKO in the first round.

On June 21, 2019, it was reported that Holbrook was released from the UFC.

Championships and accomplishments

Mixed martial arts 
 Colosseum Combat Fighting
 Lightweight Champion (One time) vs. Tyler Combs

Mixed martial arts record 

|-
| Loss
| align=center| 12–3
|Thibault Gouti
|TKO (punches)
|UFC Fight Night: Volkov vs. Struve 
|
|align=center|1
|align=center|4:28
|Rotterdam, Netherlands
|
|-
| Loss
| align=center| 12–2
| Gregor Gillespie
| KO (punches)
| UFC 210
| 
| align=center| 1
| align=center| 0:21
| Buffalo, New York, United States
|
|-
| Win
| align=center| 12–1
| Jake Matthews
| Decision (split)
| UFC Fight Night: Whittaker vs. Brunson
| 
| align=center| 3
| align=center| 5:00
| Melbourne, Australia
|
|-
| Loss
| align=center| 11–1
| Joaquim Silva
| KO (punches)
| The Ultimate Fighter: Team Joanna vs. Team Cláudia Finale
| 
| align=center| 1
| align=center| 0:34
| Las Vegas, Nevada, United States
|
|-
| Win
| align=center| 11–0
| Ramsey Nijem
| Decision (split)
| UFC on Fox: Dillashaw vs. Barao 2
| 
| align=center| 3
| align=center| 5:00
| Chicago Illinois, United States
|
|-
| Win
| align=center| 10–0
| Tyler Combs
| TKO (punches)
| Colosseum Combat 32
| 
| align=center| 1
| align=center| 4:31
| Kokomo, Indiana, United States
| 
|-
| Win
| align=center| 9–0
| Ramico Blackmon
| Submission (guillotine choke)
| Michiana Fight League 37
| 
| align=center| 1
| align=center| 4:58
| South Bend, Indiana, United States
|
|-
| Win
| align=center| 8–0
| Ian Rammel
| Submission (brabo choke)
| Midwest Fighting Series 12
| 
| align=center| 1
| align=center| 1:33
| Indianapolis, Indiana, United States
|
|-
| Win
| align=center| 7–0
| Jacob Clark
| Submission (Guillotine Choke)
| Midwest Fighting Series 10
| 
| align=center| 1
| align=center| 1:18
| Indianapolis, Indiana, United States
|
|-
| Win
| align=center| 6–0
| Gino DiGiulio
| Submission (punches)
| Midwest Fighting Series 9
| 
| align=center| 2
| align=center| 2:23
| Indianapolis, Indiana, United States
|
|-
| Win
| align=center| 5–0
| Daniel Head
| Submission (guillotine choke)
| Colosseum Combat 27
| 
| align=center| 1
| align=center| 1:58
| Kokomo, Indiana, United States
| 
|-
| Win
| align=center| 4–0
| Andrew Huffman
| Submission (armbar)
| Midwest Fighting Series 6
| 
| align=center| 1
| align=center| 3:14
| Indianapolis, Indiana, United States
|
|-
| Win
| align=center| 3–0
| Ryan McIntosh
| Submission (punches)
| Midwest Fighting Series 5
| 
| align=center| 1
| align=center| 2:05
| Indianapolis, Indiana, United States
|
|-
| Win
| align=center| 2–0
| Brandon Priest
| Submission (choke)
| Midwest Fighting Series 4
| 
| align=center| 1
| align=center| 4:12
| Indianapolis, Indiana, United States
|
|-
| Win
| align=center| 1–0
| Joel Miller
| Submission (rear-naked choke)
| Absolute Cage Fighting 2
| 
| align=center| 1
| align=center| 3:09
| Indianapolis, Indiana, United States
|
|-

See also
 List of current UFC fighters
 List of male mixed martial artists

References

External links
 
 

Living people
1986 births
American male mixed martial artists
Lightweight mixed martial artists
Mixed martial artists utilizing boxing
Mixed martial artists utilizing wrestling
Mixed martial artists utilizing Brazilian jiu-jitsu
People from Adrian, Michigan
Mixed martial artists from Michigan
Ultimate Fighting Championship male fighters
American practitioners of Brazilian jiu-jitsu